The following lists events that happened during 1963 in Australia.

Incumbents

Monarch – Elizabeth II
Prime Minister –  Robert Menzies
Governor General – William Sidney, 1st Viscount De L'Isle
Chief Justice – Sir Owen Dixon

State Premiers
Premier of New South Wales – Robert Heffron
Premier of South Australia – Sir Thomas Playford
Premier of Queensland – Frank Nicklin
Premier of Tasmania – Eric Reece
Premier of Western Australia – David Brand
Premier of Victoria – Henry Bolte

State Governors
Governor of New South Wales – Sir Eric Woodward 
Governor of Queensland – Sir Henry Abel Smith
Governor of South Australia – Sir Edric Bastyan
Governor of Tasmania – Sir Thomas Corbett, 2nd Baron Rowallan (until 25 March) then Sir Charles Gairdner
Governor of Western Australia – Sir Charles Gairdner (until 25 October) then Sir Douglas Kendrew
Governor of Victoria – Sir Dallas Brooks (until 8 May) then Sir Rohan Delacombe

Events
 John Carew Eccles is announced as the Australian of the Year
 The first stage of the Ord River Scheme is completed
 British nuclear tests at Maralinga ceased
 March – a special federal conference of the Australian Labor Party was called on the building of a North-west Cape communications facility which would support the US nuclear submarine capability.  Despite the opposition of the Left faction, the Australian Labor Party National Executive voted narrowly to support the base.
21 March – At the conference, Arthur Calwell and Gough Whitlam were photographed outside the venue at Kingston in Canberra.  Although Calwell was the Leader of the Opposition, neither man was a member of the federal executive.  Menzies jibed that the ALP was ruled by "36 faceless men".
 14 August – Yolngu people petitioned the Australian House of Representatives with a bark petition after the government sold part of the Arnhem Land reserve on 13 March to a bauxite mining company.  The government did not consult the traditional owners. When bauxite mining at Nhulunbuy near Yirrkala went ahead, the Yolngu took their case against the mining company to the Northern Territory Supreme Court. Despite their claim not being upheld in the 1971 court decision, non-indigenous Australians were alerted to the need for indigenous representation in such decisions, and a permanent parliamentary standing committee was created to scrutinise developments at Yirrkala, among other initiatives related to the indigenous people's moral right to their lands.
 1 November – Indigenous Australians could vote in federal elections on the same basis as other electors when an amendment to the Commonwealth Electoral Act became law. The November 1963 election was the first federal election for Indigenous people in Western Australia, Queensland and the Northern Territory. Indigenous voting rights in other states had been in place since 1949.
 15 November - The Queensland Police Service raids the town of Mapoon, forcing residents at gunpoint to leave their houses and board a boat for relocation 200 km to the north.
30 November – Federal election: The Coalition government was returned with an increased majority of 10 seats over the Australian Labor Party.  The election was for the House of Representatives only.

Science and technology
 John Carew Eccles shares the Nobel Prize in Physiology or Medicine for his work on the synapse
3 December – Australians could connect more easily by telephone with the rest of the world by International Direct Dialling with the opening of the Commonwealth Pacific Cable System (COMPAC). This was part of a scheme to connect the British Commonwealth by telephone.

Arts and literature

Careful, He Might Hear You by Sumner Locke Elliott
is awarded the Miles Franklin Literary Award

Film
Short films produced in Australia included the following screened at the Venice Film Festival
 Adam and Eve – Dusan Marek
 Along the Sepik – Ian Dunlop
 Russell Drysdale – Dahl Collings
 Sidney Nolan – Dahl Collings
 They Found a Cave – Andrew Steane – XV Int. Festival Films for Young People
 William Dobell – Dahl Collings
Others:
The Queen Returns – The 1963 Australian visit of Her Majesty The Queen and His Royal Highness The Duke of Edinburgh was filmed by the Commonwealth Film Unit. Much of the 30-minute film is devoted to Canberra and its history as the Queen's visit coincided with Canberra's Jubilee Celebrations – 50 years since the founding of the city.

Television
Nine Network founded as the "National Television Network"

The panel show Beauty and the Beast premieres on the Seven Network.

Sport
 Athletics
 3 March – Dixie Willis breaks Lyudmila Shevtsova's world record (2:04.3) in the women's 800 metres, clocking 2:01.2 in Perth.
 Cricket
 Victoria wins the Sheffield Shield
 Australia draws with England 1–1 and retains The Ashes
 Football
 Brisbane Rugby League premiership: Norths defeated Wests 18–8 ** New South Wales Rugby League premiership: St. George defeated Western Suburbs 8–3 ** South Australian National Football League premiership: won by Port Adelaide
 Victorian Football League premiership: Geelong defeated Hawthorn 109-60
 Golf
 Australian Open: won by Gary Player
 Australian PGA Championship: won by Col Johnston
 Horse Racing
 Arctic Star wins the AJC Oaks
 Sometime wins the Caulfield Cup
 Summer Regent wins the Cox Plate
 Pago Pago wins the Golden Slipper
 Gatum Gatum wins the Melbourne Cup
 Motor Racing
 The Australian Grand Prix was held at Warwick Farm, and was won by Jack Brabham driving a Brabham Climax
 The Armstrong 500 was held at Bathurst, and was won by Harry Firth and Bob Jane driving a Ford Cortina Mk 1 GT
 Squash
 British Open Squash Championships: Heather Blundell wins the Women's Championship
 Tennis
 Australian Open men's singles: Roy Emerson defeats Ken Fletcher 6–3 6–3 6–1 ** Australian Open women's singles: Margaret Court defeats Jan Lehane O'Neill 6–2 6–2
 Davis Cup: Australia is defeated by the United States 2–3 in the 1963 Davis Cup final
 French Open: Roy Emerson wins the Men's Singles
 French Open: Lesley Turner Bowrey wins the Women's Singles
 French Open: Roy Emerson and Manuel Santana win the Men's Doubles
 US Open: Robyn Ebbern and Margaret Court win the Women's Doubles
 Wimbledon: Margaret Court becomes the first Australian to win the Ladies' Singles
 Yachting
 Astor takes line honours and Freya wins on handicap in the Sydney to Hobart Yacht Race

Births
1 January – Glenn Trimble, cricketer  
5 January – Vanessa Browne-Ward, high jumper
13 January – Peter Scully, criminal
18 February - Cameron Williams, TV Presenter
2 March – Anthony Albanese, politician
17 March – John Platten, Australian Rules football player
29 March – Elle Macpherson, model
31 March – Paul Mercurio, actor and dancer
26 April – Colin Scotts, Australian-born American football player
8 May – Anthony Field, Australian guitarist, songwriter, producer, and actor (The Cockroaches and The Wiggles)
14 June – Grant Kenny, iron man and canoeist
27 June – Paul Roos, footballer and coach
8 September – Danny Frawley, Australian rules football player (died 2019)
13 September – Phillip Dutton, equestrian rider
30 September
Stan Grant, journalist
Greg Williams, Australian Rules football player
23 October – Craig Bradley, Australian Rules football player
15 November – Benny Elias, rugby league player
16 November – Tim Ferguson, comedian (Doug Anthony All Stars)
24 November – Stephen Lacey, author
10 December – John Elias (in Lebanon), rugby league player and coach
30 December – Alister Henskens, politician

Deaths
 19 March – Lionel Hill, Premier of South Australia (born 1881)
 28 May – Margaret Preston, artist (born 1875)
 1 June – Walter Lee, Premier of Tasmania (born 1874)
 21 June – Harvey Sutton, track and field athlete (born 1882)
 10 October – Roy Cazaly, Australian Rules football player (born 1893)
 2 November – Daniel Mannix, Archbishop of Melbourne (born 1864)

See also
 List of Australian films of the 1960s

References

 
Australia
Years of the 20th century in Australia